The Film Guild Cinema was a movie house designed by notable architectural theoretician and De Stijl member, Frederick Kiesler (earlier designs by Eugene De Rosa). It was located at 52 W. 8th St. in Greenwich Village, New York City. It was built in 1929. It was renamed the 8th Street Playhouse a year later.

The first stage performance was of Life & Love-Ballet of Hands & first film shown was The Frog Princess.

Kiesler, in writing about the new design for the cinema, billed it as "The first 100% cinema".  By the end of World War II, the original exterior designed by Kiesler had been stripped away.  The theater eventually became known for its quirky film festivals and for its nightly midnight movies, most famously, The Rocky Horror Picture Show with the world-famous 8th Street Playhouse Floorshow. After owner Steve Hirsch died in 1986, the theater was taken over by BS Moss, then United Artists, and finally by City Cinemas.  It was closed in 1991.

The building was used as the New York location of the Philadelphia TLA Video chain, a video rental store specializing in non-mainstream film until 2004.  It currently houses the offices of urgent care physicians associated with Mount Sinai Hospital.

References

Cinemas and movie theaters in Manhattan
Greenwich Village
Repertory cinemas
Theatres completed in 1929
Former theatres in Manhattan
1939 establishments in New York City
1991 disestablishments in New York (state)